Sir Matthew Clerke (1564 - 1 May 1623) was an English politician who sat in the House of Commons from 1614 to 1622.

Clerke was born in London the son  of Richard Clerke of King's Lynn. He was admitted at Christ's College, Cambridge on 11 April 1581. He was awarded BA in 1585 and MA in 1588. In 1605 he was mayor of Lynn. He was mayor of Lynn again in 1613. In 1614, he was elected Member of Parliament for King's Lynn. In 1622 he was re-elected MP for King's Lynn.

Clerke died at the age 59 in 1623.

References

1564 births
1623 deaths
Alumni of Christ's College, Cambridge
People from King's Lynn
Mayors of King's Lynn
English MPs 1614
English MPs 1621–1622